Claire Battershill is a Canadian fiction writer and literary scholar. 
On September 15, 2017, Battershill was honoured by receiving a Social Sciences and Humanities Research Council Talent Award from Governor General David Johnston.

Her collection of short stories, Circus, was published by McClelland and Stewart in 2014. The title story won the CBC Literary Award for Short Fiction. The book won the Kobo Emerging Writer Prize, was a co-winner of the Canadian Authors Association Emerging Writer Award, and was a finalist for the Danuta Gleed Award and the PEN International New Voices Award.

She holds a BA (Hons) in English  from the University of Oxford and a PhD in book history and English literature from the University of Toronto. She publishes academically on the literary history and culture of the 20th century, especially on Virginia Woolf and her publishing house, the Hogarth Press.

She was born in Dawson Creek, British Columbia, and is the sister of novelist Andrew Battershill.

Awards
 2017, Social Sciences and Humanities Research Council's Talent Award

References

Canadian women short story writers
21st-century Canadian short story writers
Year of birth missing (living people)
Writers from British Columbia
Living people
People from Dawson Creek
21st-century Canadian women writers
Alumni of the University of Oxford
University of Toronto alumni